Faruk Süren (born 1945) is a Turkish of Assyrian (Syriac)  origin businessman and former chairman of the Turkish sports club Galatasaray.

Süren was born in Istanbul as Faruk Sürenyan. He went to Deutsche Schule Istanbul and graduated from a German high school in (Germany), then studied business administration in Istanbul University. After serving as vice-president for years, he was elected as the president of Galatasaray S.K. in 1996, a position he held for five years. He is fluent in English, French and German as well as his native Turkish. He is married and has two children. One of his daughter is married to 38.President of Galatasaray S.K. Burak Elmas

Galatasaray S.K. won the UEFA Cup and the European Super Cup would join with four consecutive Turkish league titles. This accomplishments would make Süren the most popular and successful chairman of all-time.

See also
 List of Galatasaray S.K. presidents

References
 http://www.galatasaray.org/English/Corporate/history/baskanlar.asp
 http://www.galatasaray.org/kurumsal/tarihce/baskan_kupa.asp 
 http://www.hurriyet.com.tr/nurten-erk-cimboma-abdli-ortak-39104626 

1945 births
Living people
Businesspeople from Istanbul
Galatasaray S.K. presidents
Deutsche Schule Istanbul alumni
Turkish people of Armenian descent
Turkish people of Italian descent
Turkish people of Bosniak descent